Umbro is an English sports equipment manufacturer founded in 1924 in Wilmslow, Cheshire and based in Manchester. They specialise in football and rugby sportswear featuring their Double Diamond logo. Umbro products are marketed in over 100 countries.

The business was started by brothers Harold and Wallace Humphreys. The name is a portmanteau of um, from Humphreys, and bro from brothers.

Since 2012, the marque is a subsidiary of American brand management company Iconix Brand Group.

History

Beginning and expansion
The business started in 1920 at The family's pub, once owned by the parents of Harold Humphreys and his brother Wallace, who founded Humphreys Brothers Limited in 1924, initially working out of a small cupboard in the pub before moving to a workshop in Wilmslow. Inspired by the rapidly growing interest in football witnessed nationwide. The company name was changed in 1924 to "Umbro" and is a quasi-portmanteau inspired by Humphreys Brothers Clothing. Umbro's kit debut was in the 1934 FA Cup final, when both teams - Manchester City and Portsmouth - wore kits designed and manufactured by the company. Other notably successful teams supplied by Umbro during the 1930s and 1940s were Sheffield United, Preston North End, Manchester United, Tottenham Hotspur and Blackpool.

In 1952, the British team at the Summer Olympics wore Umbro kits, tailored for the needs of their individual sports. Umbro would supply kits for the British Olympics team for the next 20 years.

In 1957, Umbro entered the tennis market, producing sports clothing in collaboration with player Ted Tinling. This collaboration extended for three decades. Another sportsman who collaborated with Umbro was Manchester United manager Matt Busby, in 1959. That same year the company started to sell its junior boys' kits, a set of shirt, shorts and socks that would allow young players to wear the same look as their footballing idols.

Brazil became the first FIFA World Cup champion to wear kits by Umbro in 1958. Two years later, Manchester United Scottish player Denis Law signed an exclusive agreement with the brand, becoming the first footballer to be sponsored by Umbro. The England national team won its only title in 1966 wearing kits by Umbro (the deal had been signed in 1954). Of the 16 teams that competed, 15 wore kit manufactured by Umbro, the only exception being the USSR. By the late 1960s, 85% of British football teams wore kits manufactured by the company, including Celtic, the first British team to win a European Cup in 1967.  Liverpool FC won the first four of their six European Cups while wearing Umbro kits, in 1977, 1978, 1981 and 1984.

After more than a decade wearing Admiral kits, the England national team signed with Umbro again in 1984. In 1986, Umbro began to manufacture its own football boots. The company added footballers Alan Shearer and Michael Owen to its list of sponsored athletes. In 1994, Brazil won its fourth FIFA World Cup title in the United States and club teams AFC Ajax (in 1995), and Manchester United (in 1999) obtained the UEFA Champions League and the Intercontinental Cup, in Tokyo, all of them wearing Umbro kits.

Umbro was the official sports manufacturer of the English FA Cup and official sponsor of The FA, being the exclusive supplier of balls to the body's leagues.

In the United States, Umbro was the majority owner (94%) of United Soccer Leagues, the parent organisation for North America's lower division men's soccer (tiers two through four in the American Soccer Pyramid), and the second tier women's league (W-League) and youth league (Super Y-League). During the 2009 USL First Division season, the Carolina RailHawks, Charleston Battery, Vancouver Whitecaps, Rochester Rhinos, Austin Aztex, and Puerto Rico Islanders all wore Umbro kits. During the 2012 USLPro season, the Dayton Dutch Lions wore Umbro.

In October 2007, JJB Sports bought a 10.1% stake in Umbro in a move to protect its stake in the market for England football shirts.

Nike agreement

On 23 October 2007, it was announced Umbro had agreed to be bought out by Nike in a deal worth , the equivalent of 193p per share. The Umbro board recommended to its shareholders they vote in favour of the approach, as it offered a very competitive price for the business. Umbro's share price at the time of the offer was close to 130p. The deal was approved by regulators in December 2007 and concluded in February 2008. With the objective of revitalising the brand, Umbro launched the "Tailored by England" lines. As of 4 June 2009, Umbro signed a deal with Manchester City to supply kits for the team. Wearing Umbro kits, Manchester City won their first major trophy in 34 years.

In 2010, Umbro became sponsor of reformed American team New York Cosmos to be its exclusive kit supplier.

In May 2012, Nike reported that they would be selling Umbro (along with Cole Haan) in order to focus on their sports brands, including Nike, Converse, Hurley and Air Jordan. In September 2012, The FA announced that future England kits would be manufactured by Nike.

Iconix Brand Group
In October 2012, Nike announced that it had agreed with Iconix Brand Group to sell Umbro for US$225 million. The acquisition was completed in December 2012.

In February 2014, it was announced that Umbro would supply Everton from the start of the 2014–15 football season. This was the first new club announcement since Iconix Brand Group bought Umbro, and was followed by the announcement of similar deals with Hull City and French clubs Lens and Nantes. On 9 June 2014, Derby County announced that their kits for the 2014–15 season would be made by Umbro.

Later in 2014, Umbro announced deals to supply a number of teams, including the Serbian national football team, the Malawi national football team, Vasco da Gama and Grêmio.

In February 2015, Dutch Eredivisie champions PSV announced a new kit deal with Umbro, replacing PSV's previous deal with Nike, which had been in existence since 1994. The deal coincided with PSV's return to the UEFA Champions League after a six-year absence.

In late April 2015, West Ham United announced a new five-year agreement with Umbro as the club's official technical partner. This agreement included creating a commemorative kit for the Hammers' final year in the historic Boleyn Ground.

In early December 2015, German club 1. FC Nürnberg announced a long-term kit deal with Umbro as the club's official kit supplier, replacing Adidas.

In May 2016, it was announced that Umbro had become the technical sponsor of Blackburn Rovers in a five-year deal. It would also return to making AFC Bournemouth's kit after two occasions in the 1970s and 1980s for the 2017–18 season.

In June 2017, seven-time German champion FC Schalke 04 announced a five-year deal with Umbro, replacing Adidas after 55 years. Also in December 2017, Umbro announced a deal with the Jamaica national team.

Products
Umbro currently focuses on football and rugby union equipment, with products such as kit (jerseys, shorts and socks), and boots, as well as manufacturing other clothing such as t-shirts and jackets.

Until the mid-1980s, the company manufactured only sports clothing, in particular football jerseys, shorts and socks, but had no footwear range. Eventually, in 1985, Umbro decided to introduce its first football boot into the Brazilian market. This design, cheaper than the products of existing boot brands such as Adidas, proved popular and went into mass production internationally two years later.

Umbro also manufactured a popular style of shorts that reached its peak in the United States in the late 1980s and early 1990s. They were made of nylon, had a drawstring waistband, and often came in bright colours. With the growth of youth soccer leagues in the U.S. in the 1980s, many youths, teens and young adults began wearing them as everyday clothing. At the height of the "Umbro fashion," other brands of football shorts, such as Adidas, Diadora, Hummel, Lotto and Mitre, also became popular. Its major competitors in this market include Reebok, Nike, Adidas, Puma and Lotto.

Other releases by Umbro include the Stealth boot, released in 2010 and worn by players such as Gaël Clichy and Phil Jagielka. The same year, the company released the GT, worn by then-Fulham striker Darren Bent. The company announced it as its lightest ever boot. This was succeeded by the GT II model. June 2011 saw the release of the Umbro Geometra Pro. In 2013, Umbro introduced to a new wave of releases that included the Speciali IV and the Geometra II.

Following the purchase of the brand by Iconix Brand Group in 2013, the first major product release from Umbro was the UX-1, a technologically advanced football boot which was voted as one of the best new releases of the year.

Sponsorships

Football
Umbro is the official supplier and sponsor of numerous association football teams, players and associations, including:

Confederations and Associations
   Confédération Africaine de Football

National teams

Africa

America

Club teams 
Africa

  CR Belouizdad
  JS Saoura
  Hearts of Oak 
  Kwara United 
  AFC Leopards
  F.C. Kariobangi Sharks
  Lioli
  Cape Town City
  Moroka Swallows F.C.
  University of Pretoria
  Bloemfontein Celtic 
  Black Leopards 
  Supersport United 
  Township Rollers 
  Al-Hilal
  Club Africain
  Express
  Green Buffaloes
  Mufulira Wanderers
  Nkana
  Power Dynamos
  Zanaco
  ZESCO United
  Black Rhinos

Asia

  Melbourne Knights
  Erbil SC
  Al-Mina'a
  Naft Maysan FC
  V-Varen Nagasaki
  Terengganu FC
  Terengganu FC II
  Lalitpur
  Warriors FC
  AS Ponta Leste
  Seongnam FC

Europe

 AFC Bournemouth
 AFC Wimbledon (From 2023/24 season)
 Brentford
 Burnley
 Derby County
 Huddersfield Town
 Hull City  (Until 2022/23 season)
 Ipswich Town  (From 2022/23 season)
 Luton Town
 Shrewsbury Town 
 West Ham United  (Until 2022/23 season)
 Lahti
 Chambly
 L'Entente SSG
 Guingamp
 FC Lorient  (From 2022/23 season)
 Stade de Reims
 Bremer SV
 Dynamo Dresden
 Dynamo Dresden II
 VfL Osnabrück  (From 2022/23 season)
 Werder Bremen  (Until 2022/23 season)
 Werder Bremen II  (Until 2022/23 season)
 Bray Wanderers
 Treaty United
 Shamrock Rovers  
 St Patrick's Athletic
 Waterford
 Shelbourne
 Drogheda United  (Until 2022 - 2023 season)
 Dundalk  (Until 2022 - 2023 season)
 Wexford
 Beitar Jerusalem 
 Glentoran
 Linfield
 Aalesund
 Bryne
 Haugesund
 Jerv
 Mjøndalen
 Ranheim
 Sogndal
 Start
 Vålerenga
 Airdrieonians F.C.
 Heart of Midlothian
 Zemun
 Rayo Vallecano  (From 2022/23 season)
 Rayo Vallecano B  (From 2022/23 season)
 Salamanca CF
 Xerez Deportivo FC
 Elfsborg
 Degerfors
 Gefle IF
 Örgryte
 Göztepe  

North America

  C.S. Herediano
  Club Deportivo Águila
  Alianza F.C.
  C.S.D. Municipal
  Club Deportivo Olimpia
  Leones Negros UdeG
  Club Puebla

South America

  Almirante Brown
  Argentinos Juniors 
  Atlético Tucumán 
  Rosario Central
  Athletico Paranaense 
  Avaí 
  Brusque
  Chapecoense
  Cuiabá
  Fluminense 
  Grêmio
  PSTC
  Portuguesa Santista
  Santos
  Sport Recife
  Club de Deportes Rodelindo Román
  Universidad Católica del Ecuador
  Aucas
  Deportivo Municipal
  Universidad de San Martín de Porres
  Montevideo Wanderers
   Club Nacional de Football (Until 2022-23 season)

Rugby Union

National teams

Club teams
  Selknam
  Bristol Bears
  Ospreys

Athletes

  Matias Cordoba
 Leandro Lino
 Otavio Dutra
 Demerson
 Douglas Packer
  Stéphane Mbia
  Esteban Paredes
  Carlos Muñoz
 Héctor Urrego
 Antony Otero
 Mario González
 Luis Delgado
 Charles Monsalvo
 Jordy Monroy
 Juan Manuel Leyton
 Wilder Medina
 Sergio Herrera
 Camilo Pérez
 Hugo Alejandro Acosta
 Óscar Rodas
 Dairon Mosquera
 Fausto Obeso
 Jhon Chaverra
 John Breyner Caicedo
  Juan Guillermo Pedroza
  Jacob Butterfield  
  Doug Reed
  Olivier Blondel
  Mody Traoré
  Olivier Sorin 
  Kevin Ramirez
 Shoaib Akhtar 
 Sohail Khan 
 Arthur Irawan
 Fadil Sausu
 Sandi Sute
 Hamka Hamzah
 Ismed Sofyan
 Titus Bonai
 Paulo Sitanggang
 Dirga Lasut
 Hamka Hamzah
 Richard Keogh 	
 Wes Hoolahan 
 Michail Antonio
 Yasuhito Endō 
 Yoo Jae Hoon
 Paolo Guerrero
 Edison Flores 
 Vladimir Vujović
  Mišo Brečko 
  Ebrahim Seedat
  Judas Moseamedi
  Kamogelo Mogotlane
  Biel Company 
  Jon Irazusta 
 Ashlyn Harris
  Mikkel Diskerud 
  Jeb Brovsky
 Cuthbert Malajila

Handball
 Byåsen HE
 Elverum
 Vipers
 Arendal

Curling

Volleyball
 Associação Social e Esportiva Sada

Motor racing
 Williams Racing (from 2021 season)

Artists
 Jay Park

References

External links

 

Shoe companies of the United Kingdom
Sporting goods manufacturers of the United Kingdom
Companies listed on the London Stock Exchange
Sporting goods brands
Clothing companies of England
English brands
British companies established in 1924
Clothing companies established in 1924
Manufacturing companies established in 1924
1924 establishments in England
Companies based in Greater Manchester
Cheadle, Greater Manchester
Sportswear brands
Iconix Brand Group
2007 mergers and acquisitions
2012 mergers and acquisitions
British subsidiaries of foreign companies